Alan Jacob Milwee (born January 19, 1986) is an American football coach who is currently the quarterbacks coach at the University of Texas at Austin. He also has stints as an assistant coach at Akron, East Mississippi Community College, and North Alabama. He played college football at North Alabama, where he broke program records in completions and touchdown passes and was a two-time Harlon Hill Trophy finalist.

Playing career 
A native of Boaz, Alabama, Milwee initially walked-on at Alabama in 2004, redshirting the season as a reserve quarterback. He then transferred to then-Division II North Alabama to play for head coach Mark Hudspeth. After spending the 2005 season as a backup quarterback, Milwee was named the starting quarterback in 2006 where he compiled a 33–5 record and broke several program records including passing yards, completions, and passing touchdowns. He was also a two-time finalist for the Harlon Hill Trophy, an award given to the top college football player in Division II football.

Coaching career 
Milwee worked as a graduate assistant at his alma mater North Alabama under Terry Bowden from 2009 to 2010, and later at East Mississippi Community College in 2011 as their quarterbacks coach.

Akron 
Milwee was named the quarterbacks coach at Akron in 2012, working once again under Terry Bowden. He was promoted to offensive coordinator in 2013 at the age of 26, the 2nd youngest coordinator in FBS at the time of his hiring. He was not retained after the firing of Bowden in 2018 and was replaced by Tommy Zagorski.

Alabama 
Milwee was hired as an offensive analyst at Alabama. He was later hired to be the offensive coordinator at Arkansas State under former Alabama analyst Butch Jones before accepting a position at Texas.

Texas 
Milwee was hired away from Arkansas State as the quarterbacks coach at Texas under former Alabama offensive coordinator Steve Sarkisian.

References

External links 
 A. J. Milwee on Twitter
 Akron bio

1986 births
Living people
People from Boaz, Alabama
Players of American football from Alabama
American football quarterbacks
Alabama Crimson Tide football players
North Alabama Lions football players
Coaches of American football from Alabama
North Alabama Lions football coaches
East Mississippi Lions football coaches
Akron Zips football coaches
Alabama Crimson Tide football coaches
Texas Longhorns football coaches